Carabus hummeli nevelskii is a subspecies of ground beetle in the subfamily Carabinae that is endemic to Sakhalin, Russia.

References

hummeli nevelskii
Beetles described in 1996
Endemic fauna of Sakhalin